Bottoms is a surname. Notable people with this surname include:
Benjamin A. Bottoms, U.S. Coast Guardsman who died during a rescue attempt in Greenland
Joseph Bottoms, American actor
Keisha Lance Bottoms, American politician and mayor of Atlanta
Sam Bottoms, American actor
Scott Bottoms, American politician and pastor from Colorado
Timothy Bottoms, American actor

See also
Bottom (surname)